Dandapani was an ancient Indian king from the Koliya dynasty, who ruled a city called Koli. He was born in Devadaha as a Koliya Prince, as one of the sons of Añjana and Yasodharā. He was a brother to Suppabuddha and to his sisters Māyā and Pajāpatī. He was the Buddha's maternal uncle.

Life
According to northern sources the Prince Siddhartha's wife was Dandapani's brother's (King Suppabuddha's) daughter.it is said Suppabuddha and Dandapani and devdatta offer fish and seafood while marrying yashodhara to buddha but buddha and shonda get angry about it and all of them apologize to buddha.  In history, it is recorded that when Dandapānī met with and questioned Buddha on his teachings in Kapilavastu. The Buddha explained the teachings to him, but he was not satisfied, and went away "shaking his head, wagging his tongue, with his brow puckered into three wrinkles".

Buddhaghosa says that he received his name from the fact of his always being seen with a golden walking-stick and was a follower of Devadatta.

See also
Shakya
Yasodharā
Devadatta
Suppabuddha

References

Family of Gautama Buddha